Brigitte Omboudou (born 29 July 1992) is a Cameroonian footballer who plays as a midfielder for Amazone FAP and the Cameroon women's national team.

Club career
Omboudou has played in her country for Louves Minproff. Outside Cameroon, she has made appearances for Belarusian Premier League club FC Minsk and Nigerian Women Premier League club Delta Queens FC.

International career
Omboudou played for Cameroon at senior level in the 2015 African Games and the 2020 CAF Women's Olympic Qualifying Tournament (fourth round).

References

External links 
 

1992 births
Living people
Women's association football midfielders
Cameroonian women's footballers
Cameroon women's international footballers
African Games silver medalists for Cameroon
African Games medalists in football
Competitors at the 2015 African Games
FC Minsk (women) players
Cameroonian expatriate women's footballers
Cameroonian expatriate sportspeople in Belarus
Expatriate women's footballers in Belarus
Cameroonian expatriate sportspeople in Nigeria
Expatriate footballers in Nigeria Women Premier League
Delta Queens F.C. players
20th-century Cameroonian women
21st-century Cameroonian women